Taniwel is a village and kecamatan on the northwestern coast of the Indonesian island of Seram.

Geography
The Sapalewa River flows underground between the villages of Taniwel and Buria through the mountains of Hatu Toi Siwa, currently explored for about 3.7 kilometers. It is one of the largest underground rivers of the planet.

See also
Niwelehu: village in Taniwel

References

Populated places in Seram Island
Central Maluku Regency